The Buffalo Soldiers National Museum, located in Houston, Texas, is a museum dedicated to the history and achievements of Buffalo Soldiers and African American soldiers from all of the branches of the United States Military.

Founding 
The museum was founded in 2001 by Vietnam veteran and military historian, Captain Paul Matthews.

Collection and programs 
Captain Matthews collected African American military memorabilia for thirty years prior to opening the museum. Many of the items in the museum's collection were donated by Matthews.

The museum is open to the public for tours and events.

Building 
The museum moved from 1834 Southmore Blvd to 3816 Caroline Street in 2012. The new location, a building originally built in 1925, was the former headquarters the Houston Light Guards.

In 2022, the museum received a grant from the National Trust for Historic Preservation's African American Cultural Heritage Action Fund to be used for building repairs.

References 

Museums in Houston
Military and war museums in Texas
Buffalo Soldiers